The 1998 Sudan Air Force crash  was the crash of a Sudan Air Force transport plane at Nasir that killed several of the country's most senior government leaders, including the Vice-President Zubair Mohamed Salih.

On the morning of 12 February 1998, a Sudan Air Force Antonov An-26 turboprop attempted to land at Nasir Airport. The craft overshot the end of the runway and slid into the Sobat River. The Sudanese government announced that fog and strong winds had caused the crash. The SPLA's spokesman in Nairobi announced that the crash had not been an accident, but had been caused by an SPLA attack.

Casualties
Of the 57 crew and passengers on board, 26 drowned in the river. Among the dead were:
 Salih, the vice-president
 Musa Sayed Ahmed, Director General of the Supreme Council for Peace
 Arok Thon Arok, an ex-rebel turned government army officer
 Timothy Tutlam, director of the Relief Association of Southern Sudan
Information Minister Brigadier Mohamad Kheir and another minister survived.

References

Sudan Air Force crash
Aviation accidents and incidents in Sudan
Accidents and incidents involving the Antonov An-26
Sudan Air Force crash
Sudan Air Force crash
1998 disasters in Sudan